"There's No One at All" (stylized in all caps) is a song by Vietnamese singer-songwriter Sơn Tùng M-TP. It was written by Sơn Tùng M-TP, who co-produced it with American music producer Chris Gehringer. The song was released on April 28, 2022, as Sơn Tùng M-TP's comeback single following "" (2021), and his first English-language song.

Background and release 
On April 9, 2022, Sơn Tùng changed his profile picture to a black-covered photo on all of his social media handles and unfollowed all of the people he followed on Instagram, raising speculation about a potential comeback single or new project.

On April 12, 2022, Sơn Tùng announced the new single's title as "There's No One at All". On April 20, he released the poster in his returning project and announced that the song would be released on April 28, 2022, at 20:00 (Indochina Time). On April 23, 2022, Sơn Tùng released the trailer for the music video on YouTube.

Reception 
The music video for the song passed one million views on YouTube 22 minutes after publication, and 4,4 million views after 11 hours. On April 29, 2022, the song reached the number-one spot on YouTube Vietnam's trending tab.

Removal from YouTube 

On April 29, 2022, the Vietnamese Department of Performing Arts requested for the music video for the song to be removed from YouTube due to "negative, non-educational messages". According to Phạm Cao Thái, chief inspector of the Vietnamese Ministry of Culture, Sports and Tourism, the video contained "images, actions, means of expression, and forms of performance that carry negative and inappropriate messages related to ethics, community health, and socio-psychology". 

On May 6, 2022, Sơn Tùng removed the song from YouTube, and Sơn Tùng's company, M-TP Entertainment, was fined  for the video, which authorities deemed as "negatively affecting communal and mental health".

References 

2022 singles
2022 songs